Qaleh Sefid (also Romanized as Qal‘eh Sefīd) is a village in Jowzar Rural District, in the Central District of Mamasani County, Fars Province, Iran. At the 2006 census, its population was 67, in 21 families.

References 

Populated places in Mamasani County